Macheon Station is a subway station on, and eastern terminus of, Seoul Subway Line 5.

Station layout

References

Railway stations opened in 1996
Seoul Metropolitan Subway stations
Metro stations in Songpa District